Tord Boontje (b. Oct. 3, 1968 in Enschede, Netherlands) is an industrial product designer.

Biography
He graduated from the Design Academy Eindhoven in 1991 and earned a master's degree from the Royal College of Art (RCA) in London in 1994. After graduation, he founded his eponymous design company, Studio Tord Boontje. In 2006, he created a special holiday collection for Target Department stores. In 2009, he was appointed professor and head of Design Products at RCA and stepped down in 2013 after opening a store in London in 2012. While head of Design Products at RCA, he increased the university's reputation by focusing on research while increasing student recruitment and academic leadership.

Awards
2002 – Bombay Sapphire Prize for Glass Design
2003 – Designer of the Year, Elle Decoration
2003 – Best Lighting Design, Elle Decoration
2003 – Reader's Choice for Future Classic, Elle Decoration
2004 – Best product, New York Gift Fair
2004 – Dedalus Design Award
2005 – Innovation Prize for textile collection, Cologne Fair
2005 – Dutch Designer of the Year
2006 – IF Product Design Award
2007 – Red Dot Design Award
2008 – Elle Décor Design Award
2011 – Wallpaper* Design Awards
2013 – Red Dot Design Award

Milestones
1991 – Graduated Eindhoven Design Academy
1994 – Graduated Royal College of Art
1996 – Established Studio Tord Boontje in Peckham, South London
2002 – Designed the Garland for Habitat
2004 – Happy Ever After installation at Moroso’s Milan showroom
2005 – Moved to Bourg-Argental, France
2007 – Monograph published by Rizzoli New York
2009 – Returned to London to take up position at the Royal College of Art
2012 – Moves studio to Shoreditch, East London and opens his first retail space
2013 – Steps down as Head of Design Products
2015 – ORIGINALS selling exhibition at Sotheby’s London with Emma Woffenden

References

External links
Official website
Shop

1968 births
Living people
Dutch industrial designers
Academics of the Royal College of Art
Alumni of the Royal College of Art
Design Academy Eindhoven alumni
People from Enschede